Marchetto may refer to:

Given name
Marchetto Cara (c. 1470 – probably 1525) was an Italian composer, lutenist and singer of the Renaissance.
Marchetto da Padova (Marchettus of Padua; b. 1274?; fl. 1305 – 1319) was an Italian music theorist and composer of the late medieval era.

Family name
Agostino Marchetto (born 1940), Italian archbishop, diplomat, and historian
Ennio Marchetto (born 1960), an Italian comedic live entertainer 
Maurizio Marchetto (born 1956), Italian ice speed skater, Olympic athlete

Surnames